JJG may refer to:
 Jaguaruna Regional Airport, in Brazil
 Jean-Jacques Goldman (born 1951), French musician
 Jesse James Garrett, American user experience designer